Allie Sherlock (born 7 April 2005) is an Irish singer, guitarist, songwriter, and busker. A video of her performing a cover of Ed Sheeran's "Supermarket Flowers" went viral on YouTube in June 2017. She appeared on The Ellen DeGeneres Show in 2018. Sherlock has performed frequently on Grafton Street in Dublin, Ireland.

Early and personal life
Sherlock is from Douglas in Cork, Ireland, and was born on 7 April 2005. She left primary school in 2016 due to bullying and changed to homeschooling. “It wasn’t physical, it was more the way they treated me. It was done in a sneakier, slyer way. I would come home really stressed and I would be literally perspiring from the stress," she said.

Her mother died when Sherlock was 9 years old.

Sherlock began busking in Cork and later, from the age of 11, began performing almost weekly on Grafton Street, Dublin. Her father, who is her music manager, is also present and remains "on guard when people are inappropriate". He films and uploads her YouTube videos.

Career

In 2014, Sherlock's YouTube channel was created and, as of April 2022, had over 5 million subscribers and generated over 900 million views. She later started a Patreon channel, and (as of April 2022) had over 2 million Instagram followers and 3 million on Facebook.

In 2017, she was on Britain's Got Talent (series 12) and advanced to the second round.  In August 2017, she performed at the 2017 Miss Universe Ireland pageant.

In early 2018, she performed the song Million Years Ago by Adele on ABC's The Ellen DeGeneres Show, and Perfect by Ed Sheeran on RTÉ One's The Ray D'Arcy Show. Later in 2018, Sherlock signed a five-year contract with Patriot Records, owned by OneRepublic lead vocalist, Ryan Tedder.

Live concerts by Sherlock in Ireland have included performances at the Cork Opera House (December 2016), Cyprus Avenue in Cork (December 2018), and at the Olympia Theatre, Dublin in April 2019. She performed at the Elbphilharmonie Concert Hall in Hamburg, Germany in early 2020. During their European tour in March 2020, Sherlock supported OneRepublic at concerts in Paris (France), Cologne (Germany), Utrecht (Netherlands), and the London Palladium (UK).

In February 2020, she released a first extended play (EP) of a cover of "At Last" by Etta James. In June 2020, she performed with the RTÉ Concert Orchestra as part of the final episode of RTÉ's Home School Hub. Also in 2020, Sherlock was part of a collective of female artists called "Irish Women in Harmony", that recorded  a version of Dreams in aid of a domestic abuse charity.

In December 2021, Sherlock performed on Virgin Media Television on Dave Fanning's Fanning at Whelan's show.

As of 2022, she was in studio writing songs alongside Kodaline guitarist Steve Garrigan.

On 4 June 2022, Sherlock performed at the AO Arena in Manchester (shown on ITV) for the Queen of the United Kingdom's 70th Platinum Jubilee celebrations.

Songwriting
In addition to covering songs on YouTube, Sherlock also writes original songs. Some of her original songs have included "Hero", "Locked Inside", "Without You" (released July 2021), and "Leave Me With a Decent Goodbye" (September 2021). The theme of "Hero" is self-confidence and "Locked Inside" is about how she felt during the COVID-19 quarantine period. The song "The Night Before" is about her mother's death.

Discography

Albums
 Allie Sherlock (10 tracks, released November 2017)  
A Part of Me (12 tracks, released June 2020)

EP
 Allie Sherlock (4 Songs, released February 2020)
 Live At Elbphilharmonie (5 songs, released September 2020)

Singles
 "Gabriel, How Can This Be?" (released December 2018)
 "Nothing's Gonna Stop Us Now" (released November 2020)
 "I Will Survive" (released February 2021)
 "Back to Black" (released April 2021)
 "Beggin" (released July 2021)
 "Man in the Mirror" (released July 2021)

References

External links
 
 

Living people
Irish child singers
Irish songwriters
Irish guitarists
Irish YouTubers
Musicians from County Cork
2005 births
21st-century Irish women singers
Irish buskers